Jeong Dong-gu (born 20 March 1942) is a South Korean wrestler. He competed in the men's freestyle lightweight at the 1964 Summer Olympics.

References

1942 births
Living people
South Korean male sport wrestlers
Olympic wrestlers of South Korea
Wrestlers at the 1964 Summer Olympics
Place of birth missing (living people)
Wrestlers at the 1962 Asian Games
Asian Games competitors for South Korea
20th-century South Korean people